Alexander Arkhangelsky may refer to:

 Alexander Arkhangelsky (aircraft designer) (1892–1978), aircraft designer and doctor of technical sciences
 Alexander Arkhangelsky (composer) (1846–1924), Russian composer of church music and conductor
 Alexander Arhangelskii (born 1938), Russian mathematician